Du Yuezheng (Chinese: 杜月征; born 14 September 2005) is a Chinese footballer who currently plays for Shenzhen F.C. in the Chinese Super League.

Club career

Du came on as a substitute for Gao Lin against the Cangzhou Mighty Lions F.C. on 7 July 2022, and scored a rebound after Wang Yongpo's penalty was saved, however it was offside.

Du started against Guangzhou F.C. and scored an own goal in the 21st minute on 21 August 2022.

References

2005 births
Living people
Shenzhen F.C. players
Chinese footballers
Chinese Super League players